TICA may refer to:

 Taipei International Christian Academy, a school in Taipei, Taiwan
 The International Cat Association, a US-based but multinational pedigree registry for cats
 Tisa River (Putna Întunecoasă), also known as the Tica River
 Temporal independent component analysis (tICA)
 The feminine form of Tico, slang for a native of Costa Rica